Walter Franck (16 April 1896 – 10 August 1961) was a German film actor. He appeared in 32 films between 1926 and 1952.

Selected filmography
 Master of the World (1934)
 The Island (1934)
 Escapade (1936)
 Stronger Than Regulations (1936)
 Togger (1937)
 The Deruga Case (1938)
 Der Kaiser von Kalifornien (1936)
 Alarm at Station III (1939)
 The Governor (1939)
 The Girl from Barnhelm (1940)
 Between Hamburg and Haiti (1940)
 The Years Pass (1945)
 Blocked Signals (1948)
 The Prisoner (1949)
  The Lie (1950)
 Die Tödlichen Träume (1951)
 When the Heath Dreams at Night (1952)

References

External links

1896 births
1961 deaths
German male film actors
Commanders Crosses of the Order of Merit of the Federal Republic of Germany
20th-century German male actors